Gerry Macken (born 5 October 1957) is an Irish bobsledder. He competed in the two man event at the 1992 Winter Olympics. Macken's story was the subject of a documentary film, Breaking Ice, which was shown at the 2020 Galway Film Fleadh.

References

External links
 

1957 births
Living people
Irish male bobsledders
Olympic bobsledders of Ireland
Bobsledders at the 1992 Winter Olympics
Place of birth missing (living people)